The  are diesel multiple unit (DMU) trains operated since 1990 by East Japan Railway Company (JR East) on non-electrified rural lines in Japan.

A total of 247 vehicles were built between 1989 and 1999 by Fuji Heavy Industries and Niigata Transys.

Operations
KiHa 100 and 110 series DMUs are based at the following depots and used on the following lines.
 Hanawa Line
 Kamaishi Line
 Kitakami Line
 Ōfunato Line (Ichinoseki - Kesennuma)
 Ōminato Line 
 Tohoku Main Line (Ichinoseki - Kitakami, Hanamaki - Morioka)
 Yamada Line
 Aterazawa Line (KiHa 101)
 Banetsu East Line
 Ishinomaki Line
 Kesennuma Line (Maeyachi - Yanaizu)
 Rikuu East Line
 Rikuu West Line
  depot
 Banetsu West Line (Aizu-Wakamatsu - Niitsu–Niigata)
 Uetsu Main Line (Niitsu - Sakata)
 Hakushin Line
 Yonesaka Line
 ,  depots
 Iiyama Line
 Koumi Line
  depot
 Hachikō Line (Komagawa - Takasaki) (KiHa 110–200, KiHa 111-200 + KiHa 112–200)

Past
 Iwaizumi Line (line closed in 2014)

Variants

KiHa 100-0

  long single cars built between 1989 and 1991. (46 vehicles)

The first four pre-production cars were delivered from Niigata Tekkō (now Niigata Transys) to Ichinoseki Depot in January and February 1990. Cars KiHa 100-1 and -3 were equipped with one Cummins DMF14HZ 330 hp engine per car, while cars KiHa 100-2 and -4 were each equipped with one Komatsu DMF11HZ 330 hp engine. The four pre-production cars were initially delivered with black front ends, but these were subsequently repainted white and green to match the later production series cars.

Four production-series cars were then delivered from Fuji Heavy Industries in March 1991. These were each equipped with one Komatsu DMF11HZ 330 hp engine. Differences from the four pre-production series cars included abandoning of the three pairs of tip-up seats near the doorways, and elimination of the dummy exterior window at the toilet position.

38 2nd-batch cars were delivered from June to October 1991. Cars 9 to 29, built by Fuji Heavy Industries, were delivered to Morioka Depot, and cars 30 to 46, built by Niigata Tekkō, were delivered to Ichinoseki Depot. Cars 9 to 29 are each equipped with one Niigata Tekkō DMF13HZ 330 hp engine, and cars 30 to 46 are each equipped with one Komatsu DMF11HZ 330 hp engine. Differences from the earlier 1st-batch cars included solid front-end skirts instead of the earlier pipe-style skirts.

KiHa 100-200

  long single cars built in 1993 with sliding doors instead of the earlier plug doors. (5 vehicles)

Five KiHa 100-200 cars were delivered from Fuji Heavy Industries to Hachinohe Depot in 1993. The cab sections were extended by 250 mm to provide additional crash protection, giving an overall car length of 17,000 mm. Cars are each equipped with one Komatsu DMF11HZ 330 hp engine. A wheelchair space was provided next to one doorway, giving a seating capacity of 44 and total capacity of 103 passengers (59 standing).

KiHa 101

  long single cars built 1993-1997 for Aterazawa Line services. Longitudinal seating and sliding doors. (13 vehicles)

A total of 13 KiHa 101 cars were built by Niigata Tekkō (now Niigata Transys) and allocated to Shinjō Depot for use on Aterazawa Line services. Broadly based on the KiHa 100–200 series cars, these are each equipped with one Komatsu DMF11HZ 330 hp engine. Passenger accommodation consists entirely of longitudinal bench seating. A wheelchair space was provided next to one doorway, giving a seating capacity of 44 and total capacity of 107 passengers (63 standing). The fleet is painted in an overall light blue colour scheme with "FRUITS LINER" logos.

KiHa 110-0

  long single cars built between 1990 and 1991, with plug doors. (5 vehicles)

Build details:

Three pre-production cars were delivered to Morioka Depot between January and February 1990, with cars KiHa 110-1 and 2 built by Fuji Heavy Industries, and KiHa 110-3 built by Niigata Tekkō. As with the pre-production KiHa 100-0 cars, these initially had black front ends, pipe-style front-end skirts, black dummy exterior windows at the toilet positions, and plug doors. Cars KiHa 110-1 and 3 were equipped with Niigata DMF13HZA engines, while KiHa 110-2 was equipped with a Cummins DMF14HZA engine. All three cars used lightweight bolsterless DT58 motored bogies and TR242 trailer bogies, with both axles of the motor bogies driven.

Two production series cars, KiHa 110-4 and 5 were subsequently delivered to Morioka Depot from Fuji Heavy Industries in March 1991. These had standard white/green front ends and did not have dummy exterior windows at the toilet position. Both cars are equipped with Niigata DMF13HZA engines, and use DT58A motored bogies and TR242 trailer bogies.

From 2007, four cars, excluding KiHa 110–3, were transferred to Kogota Depot for use as reserved-seating cars on Minami Sanriku rapid services.

Interior
The KiHa 110–0 series cars were intended for use on Rikuchū express services, and are fitted with rotating/reclining seats, with a seating capacity of 52 per car.

KiHa 110-100

  long single cars built between 1991 and 1992, with plug doors. (39 vehicles)

Cars KiHa 110–101 to 104 were built by Niigata Tekkō and delivered to Kōriyama Depot, cars KiHa 110–105 to 122 were built by Fuji Heavy Industries and delivered to Koumi Depot, cars KiHa 110–123 to 128 were built by Niigata Tekkō and delivered to Niigata Depot, and cars KiHa 110–129 to 139 were built by Fuji Heavy Industries and delivered to Hitachi-Daigo Depot. Differences from the KiHa 110–0 series cars included solid front-end skirts instead of the earlier pipe-style skirts and elimination of the dummy exterior window at the toilet position. All cars are equipped with Cummins DMF14HZA engines, and use DT58A motored bogies and TR242 trailer bogies.

Interior
Accommodation consists of fixed transverse seating arranged 2+1 abreast, with longitudinal bench seats at the ends of the cars. Seating capacity is 52 per car, with a total capacity of 119, including standing passengers.

KiHa 110-200

  long single cars built between 1993 and 1999 with sliding doors instead of the earlier plug doors. (45 vehicles including 14 former KiHa 110–300)

Interior

KiHa 110-300

 20.5 m long single cars built between December 1995 and February 1996 for Akita Relay limited express services, and later converted to KiHa 110-200 between May and December 1997. (14 vehicles)

KiHa 111-0 + KiHa 112-0

 20 m long twin cars built in 1990 with plug doors. (6 vehicles)

Three 2-car sets were built by Niigata Tekkō and delivered to Morioka Depot in March 1991. These were generally built to the same specifications as the full-production KiHa 110-0 cars, with plug doors, pipe-style front-end skirts. All cars are equipped with Niigata DMF13HZA engines, and have lightweight bolsterless DT58A motored bogies and TR242 trailer bogies.

Interior
The KiHa 111-0/112-0 cars were intended for use on Rikuchū express services, and are fitted with rotating/reclining seats. The KiHa 111 cars are fitted with a toilet.

KiHa 111-100 + KiHa 112-100

 20 m long twin cars built between 1991 and 1992 with plug doors. (42 vehicles)

Cars KiHa 111/112-101 to 108 were built by Niigata Tekkō and delivered to Kōriyama Depot between February and March 1991, cars KiHa 111/112-109 to 111 were also built by Niigata Tekkō and delivered to Koumi Depot in December 1991, cars KiHa 111/112-112 to 121 were built by Fuji Heavy Industries and delivered to Hitachi-Daigo Depot in February 1992. As with the KiHa 111/112-0 cars, these cars had plug doors, but had solid front-end skirts instead of the earlier pipe-style skirts. All cars are equipped with Cummins DMF14HZA engines, and use DT58A motored bogies and TR242 trailer bogies.

Following the introduction of new KiHa E130 DMUs on the Suigun Line, cars KiHa 111/112-112 to 121 original based at Hitachi-Daigo Depot were reallocated to Morioka and Kogota depot in 2007.

Interior
Interior accommodation consists of a mixture of 2+1 fixed transverse seating bays in the centre of the cars and longitudinal bench seating at the ends of cars. The KiHa 111 cars are fitted with a toilet.

KiHa 111-150 + KiHa 112-150

 20.5 m long twin cars built in 1993 with sliding doors. (4 vehicles)

Four cars, KiHa 111/112-151 to 152, were built by Fuji Heavy Industries and delivered to Suigun Depot in September 1994. These cars were built to the same specifications as the earlier (but later-numbered) KiHa 111/112-200 cars, with sliding doors. All cars are equipped with Cummins DMF14HZA engines, and use DT58A motored bogies and TR242 trailer bogies.

As with the KiHa 111/112-100 series cars, these were reallocated to Morioka Depot between 2007 and 2008 following the introduction of new KiHa E130 DMUs on the Suigun Line.

KiHa 111-200 + KiHa 112-200

 20.5 m long twin cars with toilets built between 1993 and 1995 with sliding doors. (42 vehicles including 3 former KiHa 111–300)

As with the KiHa 110-200 subseries, this fleet consists of both newly built and cars converted from KiHa 111/112-300 cars. Cars KiHa 111/112-210 to 213 were converted at JR East's Nagano Works from former Akita Relay cars KiHa 111/112-301 to 303. As with the KiHa 110-200 cars, these cars have sliding doors, solid front-end skirts, and bodies extended to 20.5 m. All cars are equipped with Cummins DMF14HZA engines, and use DT58A motored bogies and TR242 trailer bogies.

Interior
Interior accommodation consists of a mixture of 2+1 fixed transverse seating bays in the centre of the cars and longitudinal bench seating at the ends of cars. The KiHa 111 cars are fitted with a toilet.

KiHa 111-300 + KiHa 112-300
 20.5 m long twin cars delivered in 1996 for Akita Relay limited express services, and later converted to KiHa 111/112-200 between June and September 1997. (6 vehicles)

Interior
The KiHa 111-300 cars included a universal access toilet, and had a seating capacity of 52. The KiHa 112-300 cars had a seating capacity of 56.

KiHa 110-700 Tohoku Emotion

One single car and one twin-car set were converted in 2013 at JR East's Koriyama Works to become the Tohoku Emotion restaurant-car Joyful Train set for use in the north-east Tohoku Region of Japan and based at Morioka Depot. Conversion details are as shown below.

High Rail 1375

A KiHa 110 and KiHa 100 car were converted in 2017 at JR East's Nagano Works to become the two-car High Rail 1375 trainset for use on sightseeing services on the Koumi Line from 1 July 2017. "1375" refers to the elevation of 1,375 m of the highest point on any JR line in Japan. The new and former car numbers are as shown below.

Special liveries

Ofunato Line Pokémon With You Train

In December 2012, KiHa 100-1 and KiHa 100-3 were rebuilt as a special Pokémon With You Train for use on the Ofunato Line. The train entered service on 22 December 2012. The two cars underwent further interior refurbishment and repainting into a new yellow livery in 2017.

Hachiko Line 80th anniversary

In October 2014, to mark the 80th anniversary of the opening of the Hachiko Line, KiHa 111-204 and KiHa 112-204 were repainted into the cream and red livery carried by the DMUs formerly used on the line.

Koumi Line 80th anniversary
In February 2015, to mark the 80th anniversary of the opening of the Koumi Line, a single-car KiHa 110 series unit was repainted into the "Metropolitan" all-over red livery carried by KiHa 52 DMUs formerly used on the line. This was followed in March 2015 by a two-car KiHa 110 series unit (KiHa 111-111 + KiHa 112–111) repainted into the vermillion and cream JNR express train livery carried by KiHa 58 series DMUs formerly used on the line.

Iiyama Line Oykot train

Two cars, KiHa 110-235 and KiHa 110–236, were modified and repainted to become a new  special event train for use on the Iiyama Line. KiHa 110-235 was completed in December 2014, and KiHa 110-236 was completed in 2015 ahead of the official start of Oykot services in April. The name "Oykot" is derived from "Tokyo" spelled backwards.

Iiyama Line Voiture Amitié train
In March 2017, KiHa 110-231 was repainted into the Voiture Amitié blue and white livery formerly carried by a DMU used on the Iiyama Line between 1991 and 1997.

Build details
The manufacturers and delivery dates for the fleet are as shown below.

References

Further reading

External links

 JR East KiHa 100 and 110 series information 

100
East Japan Railway Company
Niigata Transys rolling stock
Train-related introductions in 1990
Fuji rolling stock